Fitra or fitrah is either the state of purity and innocence in which Muslims believe all humans to be born, or the ability to choose or reject God's guidance, with which both humans and jinn are endowed. Fitra is an Arabic word that is usually translated as "original disposition", "natural constitution", or "innate nature of any Muslim."

It has also been suggested that the religious meaning can be translated into the logical equivalent in philosophy, as Kant's concept of 'ought'.

Root of word
The root verb F-Ṭ-R means to split or cleave, also found in Iftar (breaking the fast), Eid al-Fitr, and in the 82nd chapter of the Quran (Surah Al-Infitar - The Splitting). Arabic lexicographers also relate it to create.  Fatir is usually translated as originator or creator, and thus fitra is also considered to refer to the "state of creation".

Quran, Hadith and interpretation
In surah 30 of the Quran, the word is used in the context of the following verse: "Set thy face to religion as a Hanif in the primordial nature from God upon which originated mankind there is no altering the creation of God; that is upright but most mankind know not." Seyyed Hossein Nasr links fitra in the Quran closely to the concept of Hanif (pre Islamic monotheist) and Nabi al-Ummi ("The Illiterate Prophet" or "The Aboriginal Prophet"), a notion also attested in older sources of Islamic tradition. If the term is understood to mean "divide", it might signify that God separates his creation into believers and unbelievers by means of the "true religion".

In the prophetic traditions (hadith), the term gets new attention: “No one is born except according to intrinsic nature [(fitra)], but their parents make them Jews, or Christians, or Magians, just as a cow gives birth to a calf that is whole do you find it mutilated?'" The Muʿtazila argue that Islamic law is rational and given to every born child, thus fitra is identified with Islam. This viewpoint was also adapted by several canonical traditions. In others however, fitra refers to the pre-Islamic religion, originating in Adam, before any religious obligations have been revealed. According to the Maturidi scholar (ʿĀlim) Abu al-Layth al-Samarqandi, humans and jinn are created with fitra, and thus obligated (taklīf) to follow God's law.

See also
 Natural law, the similar concept in Catholicism
 Shuddhi, the similar concept in Hinduism

Notes

Further reading

J.M. Cowan (1994), The Hans Wehr Dictionary of Modern Written Arabic
John Esposito (2003), The Oxford Dictionary of Islam
M. Masud (1996), Islamic Legal Interpretation: Muftis and Their Fatwas
Imam Ali, Nahjul Balagha: Sermons, Letters & Sayings of Imam Ali
Al-Kulayni, al-Usul mina ‘l-Kãfi, vol. 2, p. 13; al-Bukhãri, Sahih, vol. 2 (Beirut: Dãr al-Fikr, 1401) p. 104

Islamic terminology
Quranic words and phrases
Arabic words and phrases